Amphilophium crucigerum is a species of flowering plant in the family Bignoniaceae, native from Mexico through Central America into South America as far south as Argentina. It was first described by Carl Linnaeus (as Bignonia crucigera) in 1753. The synonym Pithecoctenium crucigerum has often been used.

The species has become an invasive weed in Australia. Chemical investigation of methanol extracted from this species yielded the iridoid glycoside theviridoside along with five phenylethanoid glycosides (verbascoside, isoverbascoside, forsythoside B, jionoside D and leucosceptoside B), these last all active against DPPH.

References

Bignoniaceae
Flora of Mexico
Flora of Central America
Flora of South America
Plants described in 1753